Marine Fighting Squadron 213 (VMF-213) was a reserve fighter squadron in the United States Marine Corps. Nicknamed the "Hell Hawks", the squadron fought during World War II in the Philippines and at the battles of Iwo Jima and Okinawa. The squadron was credited with downing 117 enemy aircraft during the war.

History

World War II

VMF-213 was formed July 1, 1942 at Marine Corps Air Station Ewa, Hawaii. The squadron left MCAS Ewa on February 21, 1943 and arrived at Espiritu Santo on March 1, 1943. They received their first F4U Corsairs while at Espiritu on March 11, 1943 and after a brief stint training they moved to Guadalcanal in April 1943. On June 17, 1943, VMF-213 relieved VMF-124 in the Russell Islands. While in the Solomons, VMF-213 participated in actions against New Georgia and Kahali and flew throughout the Solomon Islands until December 1943. In mid-1943, VMF-213 harmonised the six .50 inch wing guns of their Mk I Vought F4U Corsairs to converge to a point  ahead. The squadron's usual tactic was to dive upon an enemy from the front and slightly to one side (a high-side attack using full deflection) and fire when at the convergence distance.

The squadron returned to the United States for reorganization and training at Marine Corps Air Station Mojave, California. Their training was rigorous which can be seen by the daily record they set for Marine West Coast fighter squadrons in June 1944, when they flew 272.2 hours with the squadron's 21 aircraft averaging 13 hours each. After training at MCAS Ewa they met up with the USS Essex at Ulithi on December 9, 1944 and sailed west. While on board the Essex, as part of Task Force 58, VMF-213 along with VMF-124 participated in actions against Lingayen, Luzon, Formosa, Tokyo, Iwo Jima, and Okinawa. During this time they became one of the first US military units ever involved in Vietnam when they struck at Japanese Tojos that had stopped at Tan Son Nhut Air Base to refuel on January 12, 1945.

Captain James N. Cupp was a double flying ace with VMF-213 in the Solomon Islands. From July to September 1943 he scored at least 12 aerial victories. He received the Navy Cross and three Distinguished Flying Crosses during his service with the Hell Hawks.

Reserve years

Following the war the squadron was reactivated in the Marine Corps Reserve and based out of Naval Air Station Twin Cities, Minneapolis, Minnesota.  On June 9, 1956 a Grumman F9F-4 Panther from VMF-213 crashed into a row of houses near Wold-Chamberlain Field, striking the home at 5820 46th Avenue South, Minneapolis, Minnesota. In addition to killing the pilot the crash killed five and injured twelve on the ground, most of whom were young children.

Squadron Aces

Unit awards
Since the beginning of World War II, the United States military has honored various units for extraordinary heroism or outstanding non-combat service. This information is compiled by the United States Marine Corps History Division and is certified by the Commandant of the Marine Corps.

See also

 United States Marine Corps Aviation
 List of United States Marine Corps aircraft squadrons
 List of decommissioned United States Marine Corps aircraft squadrons

References

Bibliography

 
 

 Sherrod, Robert. History of Marine Corps Aviation in World War II. Washington, D.C.: Combat Forces Press, 1952. .
 Tillman, Barrett. Corsair - The F4U in World War II and Korea.  Annapolis: Naval Institute Press, 1979. .

Web
 Air Group 4
 Marine Fighting Squadron 213

Fighting213
Inactive units of the United States Marine Corps